The following outline is provided as an overview of and topical guide to Samoa:

Samoa – sovereign island nation located in the western Samoan Islands archipelago in the South Pacific Ocean.  Previous names were Samoa from 1900 to 1919, and Western Samoa from 1914 to 1997. It was admitted to the United Nations on 15 December 1976. The entire island group, inclusive of American Samoa, was known by Europeans as the Navigator Islands before the 20th century because of the Samoans' seafaring skills.

General reference 

 Pronunciation:
 Common English country name:  Samoa, archaic Western Samoa
 Official English country name:  The Independent State of Samoa
 Common endonym(s):  
 Official endonym(s):  
 Adjectival(s): Samoan
 Demonym(s): Samoan
 Etymology: Name of Samoa
 ISO country codes:  WS, WSM, 882
 ISO region codes:  See ISO 3166-2:WS
 Internet country code top-level domain:  .ws

Geography of Samoa 

Geography of Samoa
 Samoa is: a country
 Location:
 Western Hemisphere and Southern Hemisphere
 Pacific Ocean
 South Pacific Ocean
 Oceania
 Polynesia
 Time zone:  Samoa Standard Time (UTC+13), Samoa Daylight Time (UTC+14) September–April
 Extreme points of Samoa
 High:  Mauga Silisili on Savai'i 
 Low:  South Pacific Ocean 0 m
 Land boundaries:  none
 Coastline:  South Pacific Ocean 403 km
 Population of Samoa: 188,540 (2008)  - 178th most populous country

 Area of Samoa: 2,831 km2
 Atlas of Samoa

Environment of Samoa 

 Climate of Samoa
 Renewable energy in Samoa
 Geology of Samoa
 Protected areas of Samoa
 Biosphere reserves in Samoa
 National parks of Samoa
 Wildlife of Samoa
 Fauna of Samoa
 Birds of Samoa
 Mammals of Samoa

Natural geographic features of Samoa 

 Islands of Samoa
 Lakes of Samoa
 Mountains of Samoa
 Volcanoes in Samoa
 Rivers of Samoa
 Waterfalls of Samoa
 Valleys of Samoa
 World Heritage Sites in Samoa: None

Regions of Samoa 

Regions of Samoa

Ecoregions of Samoa 

List of ecoregions in Samoa
 Ecoregions in Samoa

Administrative divisions of Samoa 

Administrative divisions of Samoa
 Districts of Samoa

Districts of Samoa 

Districts of Samoa

Demography of Samoa 

Demographics of Samoa

Government and politics of Samoa 

Politics of Samoa
 Form of government: parliamentary republic
 Capital of Samoa: Apia
 Elections in Samoa
 Political parties in Samoa
 State-owned enterprises of Samoa
 Statutory Bodies of Samoa

Branches of the government of Samoa 

Government of Samoa

Executive branch of the government of Samoa 
 Head of state: O le Ao o le Malo, Tuimalealiʻifano Vaʻaletoʻa Sualauvi II
 Head of government: Prime Minister of Samoa, Fiamē Naomi Mataʻafa
 Cabinet of Samoa
 Government Ministries of Samoa

Legislative branch of the government of Samoa 

 Legislative Assembly of Samoa (unicameral)

Judicial branch of the government of Samoa 

Court system of Samoa
 Court of Appeal of Samoa (supreme court)

Constitutional Offices in Samoa
 The Office of the Attorney General 
 The Audit Office 
 The Office of the Ombudsman
 The Public Service Commission 
 Clerk of the Legislative Assembly

Foreign relations of Samoa 

Foreign relations of Samoa
 Diplomatic missions in Samoa
 Diplomatic missions of Samoa

International organization membership 
The Independent State of Samoa is a member of:

African, Caribbean, and Pacific Group of States (ACP)
Asian Development Bank (ADB)
Commonwealth of Nations
Food and Agriculture Organization (FAO)
Group of 77 (G77)
International Bank for Reconstruction and Development (IBRD)
International Civil Aviation Organization (ICAO)
International Criminal Court (ICCt)
International Development Association (IDA)
International Federation of Red Cross and Red Crescent Societies (IFRCS)
International Finance Corporation (IFC)
International Fund for Agricultural Development (IFAD)
International Labour Organization (ILO)
International Maritime Organization (IMO)
International Monetary Fund (IMF)
International Olympic Committee (IOC)
International Red Cross and Red Crescent Movement (ICRM)

International Telecommunication Union (ITU)
International Trade Union Confederation (ITUC)
Inter-Parliamentary Union (IPU)
Multilateral Investment Guarantee Agency (MIGA)
Organisation for the Prohibition of Chemical Weapons (OPCW)
Pacific Islands Forum (PIF)
Secretariat of the Pacific Community (SPC)
South Pacific Regional Trade and Economic Cooperation Agreement (Sparteca)
United Nations (UN)
United Nations Conference on Trade and Development (UNCTAD)
United Nations Educational, Scientific, and Cultural Organization (UNESCO)
Universal Postal Union (UPU)
World Customs Organization (WCO)
World Health Organization (WHO)
World Intellectual Property Organization (WIPO)
World Meteorological Organization (WMO)
World Trade Organization (WTO) (observer)

Law and order in Samoa 

Law of Samoa
 Constitution of Samoa
 Crime in Samoa
 Human rights in Samoa
 LGBT rights in Samoa
 Freedom of religion in Samoa
 Law enforcement in Samoa

Military of Samoa 

Military of Samoa
Samoa has no military.

Local government in Samoa 

Local government in Samoa

The Fa'amatai system is Samoa's chiefly system of governance existing at the local village level.

History of Samoa 

History of Samoa
 Timeline of the history of Samoa
 Current events of Samoa
 Military history of Samoa

Culture of Samoa 

Culture of Samoa
 Architecture of Samoa
 Cuisine of Samoa
 Festivals in Samoa
 Languages of Samoa
 Media in Samoa
 National symbols of Samoa
 Coat of arms of Samoa
 Flag of Samoa
 National anthem of Samoa
 People of Samoa
 Public holidays in Samoa
 Records of Samoa
 Religion in Samoa
 Christianity in Samoa
 Hinduism in Samoa
 Islam in Samoa
 Judaism in Samoa
 Sikhism in Samoa
 World Heritage Sites in Samoa: None

Art in Samoa 
 Art in Samoa
 Cinema of Samoa
 Literature of Samoa
 Music of Samoa
 Television in Samoa
 Theatre in Samoa

Sports in Samoa 

Sports in Samoa
 Football in Samoa
 Samoa at the Olympics

Economy and infrastructure of Samoa 

Economy of Samoa
 Economic rank, by nominal GDP (2007): 180th (one hundred and eightieth)
 Agriculture in Samoa
 Banking in Samoa
 National Bank of Samoa
 Communications in Samoa
 Internet in Samoa
 Companies of Samoa
Currency of Samoa: Tala
ISO 4217: WST
 Energy in Samoa
 Energy policy of Samoa
 Oil industry in Samoa
 Mining in Samoa
 Tourism in Samoa
 Transport in Samoa
 Samoa Stock Exchange

Education in Samoa 

Education in Samoa

Infrastructure of Samoa
 Health care in Samoa
 2019 Samoa measles outbreak
 Transportation in Samoa
 Airports in Samoa
 Rail transport in Samoa
 Roads in Samoa
 Water supply and sanitation in Samoa

See also 

Samoa
Index of Samoa-related articles
List of international rankings
List of Samoa-related topics
Member state of the Commonwealth of Nations
Member state of the United Nations
Outline of Oceania

References

External links 

 Government of Samoa
 
 

Samoa
 1